The Ripping Friends: The World's Most Manly Men! (also known as The Ripping Friends) is an animated television series, created by John Kricfalusi, creator of The Ren & Stimpy Show on Nickelodeon. The series aired for one season on Fox Kids, premiering on September 22, 2001 and ending on January 26, 2002. The show was subsequently picked up for syndication by Adult Swim, where it reran from 2002 to 2004. The show occasionally airs in Canada on Teletoon. The show also aired briefly in the United Kingdom on the CNX channel and on ABC in Australia.

History
Kricfalusi and his long-time partner Jim Smith created the Ripping Friends before they created the similar superhero Powdered Toast Man for The Ren & Stimpy Show. After Nickelodeon fired Kricfalusi from The Ren & Stimpy Show in September 1992, he had plans to make a feature film starring the world's "manliest men".  The feature film plan was scrapped, but the characters were used in The Ripping Friends. Also, as early as a 1987 story session for the Mighty Mouse: The New Adventures, Kricfalusi, who would go on to develop the concept for The Ripping Friends for around a decade, had proposed using a wad of gum as a character, an idea which was employed to create the first villain for the new series, the Indigestible Wad. The Ripping Friends was slated to premiere in September 2000 along with another Spümcø show on Fox Family, The Heart Aches, which follows the adventures surrounding a girl band. The latter one never made it to television, and The Ripping Friends first aired a year later, after missing another premiere slated for May 2001, lasting for thirteen episodes. The budget was set to US$400,000 per episode.
Because of production costs, the show was cancelled after one season and thirteen episodes.

Kricfalusi felt the show's supervisors were doing away with the Spümcø style and was displeased with the direction. He was not fully involved until halfway through production and considers the episodes with his involvement to be experimental. One of his contributions to the show was directing the voice actors, whom he "really worked out" so much that he was afraid he'd give one of them a heart attack, which resulted in re-casting the original voice of Crag, Harvey Atkin, with Mark Dailey. Although Kricfalusi directed the actors, he recorded for his characters separately at his home.

Plot
The show focused on a group of four superhuman brothers who attempt to fight crime from their base, RIPCOT (the Really Impressive Prototype City Of (Next) Tuesday): Crag, Rip, Slab, and Chunk Nuggett, Crag being the leader. Friends of the four include Jimmy The Idiot Boy, a mentally-challenged drooling child, and their foster mother He-Mom (the name speaks for itself). The villains range from the Indigestible Wad (a wad of gum who sucks moisture out of people), to the evil Euroslavian dictator Citracett, to Flathead (an invertebrate in search of a spine), to their own underpants.

Each episode was usually tagged with a short episode which Kricfalusi says was composed of "left overs". These segments were called "Rip Along with the Ripping Friends" and usually portrayed the Ripping Friends solving the problems of fans. These included: addressing the fact that hot dogs come in packs of 12 and the buns in packs of 8; "ripping" the man who creates insane video game controllers and the man who writes the instructions for them; and finding out why toys no longer come in cereal boxes, among others. In each segment viewers (referred to as "kids") are asked to "rip along" with the action by ripping pieces of paper up in front of the television when coaxed to.

Characters
 Crag (voiced by Harvey Atkin in the earlier appearances, Mark Dailey in later appearances) – The leader of the Ripping Friends.
 Slab (voiced by Merwin Mondesir) – Crag's right-hand man.
 Chunk Nuggett (voiced by Michael Kerr) – The childlike member of the Ripping Friends.
 Rip (voiced by Mike MacDonald) – The hothead of the Ripping Friends.
 Jimmy the Idiot Boy (voiced by John Kricfalusi) – A mentally-challenged drooling child.
 He-Mom – The Ripping Friends' foster mother.
 Citracett (voiced by John Kricfalusi) – The evil dictator of Euroslavia who is the recurring antagonist of the series, later renames himself Stinkybutt the Foul after gaining the ability to use his own flatulence as a weapon.

Episodes

Censorship 
 In a segment where Rip is asked by a fan to find out why hot dogs come in packs of twelve and hot dog buns come in packs of eight, Rip beats up a male hot dog and a female bun and asks them to "hug". The hot dog begins to slip inside the bun, and the segment immediately fades to black. The scene was restored when the episode ran on Adult Swim.
 The episodes "The Infernal Wedding" and "Jimmy's Kidnapped" never aired on Fox Kids at all, with the former being skipped due to scenes considered to be offensive following the September 11 attack. Both episodes would subsequently air on Adult Swim during reruns.

Merchandise
Hearst Entertainment and Spümcø licensed Playmates Toys to create toys based on the show. A video game based on the show was released by THQ for the Game Boy Advance and consulted by John Kricfalusi.

Telecast and home media
In the U.S., the series was first premiered on September 22, 2001 on Fox Kids until the final episode's airing on January 26, 2002. Adult Swim later picked up the show, which aired from October 6, 2002 to March 28, 2004. The show occasionally airs in Canada on Teletoon. The show also aired briefly in the United Kingdom on the CNX channel and on ABC in Australia.

Two videotapes with two episodes each were initially available with the two volumes later combined into a single DVD release with four episodes.

In Australia, the complete series was released on Region 4 DVD by Madman Entertainment.

References

External links

2000s American animated television series
2001 American television series debuts
2002 American television series endings
2000s Canadian animated television series
2001 Canadian television series debuts
2002 Canadian television series endings
American children's animated action television series
American children's animated adventure television series
American children's animated comedy television series
American children's animated superhero television series
Canadian children's animated action television series
Canadian children's animated adventure television series
Canadian children's animated comedy television series
Canadian children's animated superhero television series
Censored television series
English-language television shows
Fox Kids
Teletoon original programming
Australian Broadcasting Corporation original programming
Parody superheroes
Spümcø
Television series by 9 Story Media Group
Television series by Lionsgate Television
Superhero teams
Television series created by John Kricfalusi